The V-class was a class of five trams built by Duncan & Fraser, Adelaide from JG Brill Company kits for the North Melbourne Electric Tramway & Lighting Company (NMET) as numbers 11-15.  All passed to the Melbourne & Metropolitan Tramways Board on 1 August 1922 when it took over the NMET becoming the V-class and renumbered 212-216.

Preservation
One has been preserved:
214 as part of the VicTrack heritage fleet at Hawthorn depot

References

Melbourne tram vehicles
600 V DC multiple units